Frederique Van Der Wal (also Frédérique van der Wal) is a Dutch former model, actress, television personality and businesswoman, known for having appeared in Victoria's Secret and on the covers of magazines such as Cosmopolitan and Vogue. She grew up in The Hague.

Career
Van der Wal has appeared in campaigns for Revlon, Guess, and Victoria's Secret. She has also been profiled in Forbes and InStyle.

In 2003, Van der Wal appeared in a stage production of The Vagina Monologues (Washington D.C.), and has performed in films by directors Barry Sonnenfeld (Wild Wild West), Woody Allen (Celebrity), James Toback (Two Girls and a Guy) and Wim Wenders.

Van der Wal has produced and appeared on television programs including "World Class with Frederique" for the Scripts network, The Ultimate Holiday Towns USA, a two-hour special for A&E, as well as broadcasts in her native Holland. She was the "Mole" in the Hawaii celebrity edition of ABC's popular TV series, The Mole, and was the host and producer of Discovery TLC's Cover Shot, where she assembled an expert team of make-up artists and stylists to transform an everyday woman into a cover model. Van der Wal is currently a featured host on RTL 5's The Face.

Van der Wal has also been a guest lecturer at Harvard University and, in 2011, was the recipient of the Marie Claire Entrepreneur of the Year award. She has previously been involved in licensing deals carrying her name such as a line of lingerie, sleepwear and loungewear, a bathing suit line, a workout video, a signature fragrance, and a calendar.

In 2005, her native Holland named a lily in her honor. The "Frederique's Choice Lily" was unveiled at a ceremony in Amsterdam, and inspired her to develop, produce and host a television program called The Invisible Journey with the Discovery Channel, which traced the route a flower travels from the growing fields of Africa, through the markets and auction houses in the Netherlands, to a special event in New York City.

Subsequently, van der Wal created a lifestyle brand within the flower industry, "Frederique's Choice". With the launch of the US unit of the business in 2015, she executive produced and hosted a TV show called HomeGrownMakeover with Frederique and Carter, a 10-episode TV series which aired in 2016 on AETN's FYI channel. The program transforms homes by using flowers and plants, bringing the outdoors indoors. Her business also appeared in the season finale of Germany's Next Topmodel with host Heidi Klum.

Personal life

Van der Wal has a daughter with her partner Nicholas Klein, Scyler Pim van der Wal Klein.  Her brother is the New York independent art advisor and curator Michiel van der Wal.

Filmography
 1995 - Burnzy's Last Call as Gertrude
 1997 - Two Girls and a Guy as Carol
 1998 - 54 as VIP Patron (cameo)
 1998 - Celebrity as Friend of Supermodel
 1999 - Wild Wild West as Amazonia 
 1999 - The Venice Project as Alana/Lucrezia
 1999 - Cosby (TV series) as herself 
 2000 - The Million Dollar Hotel as Diamond Woman (cameo)

Notes

External links

Frederique.com Personal website

 
 
 

1967 births
Living people
Dutch female models
Participants in American reality television series
People from The Hague